The 2023 Liga Profesional de Primera División season, also known as the Campeonato Uruguayo de Primera División 2023, is the 120th season of the Uruguayan Primera División, Uruguay's top-flight football league, and the 93rd in which it is professional. The season, which was named "100 años del Club Atlético Cerro", began on 4 February and is scheduled to end in December 2023.

Nacional are the defending champions.

Format
On 19 October 2022, the Primera División clubs voted to keep the format used in the previous season for 2023, with single round-robin Apertura and Clausura tournaments, a Torneo Intermedio played between these tournaments with the 16 teams divided into two groups of eight, and a three-team championship playoff between the winners of the Apertura and Clausura tournaments and the best team in the season's aggregate table, which gets a bye to the finals. The League Council of the Uruguayan Football Association presented a proposal to switch the order of the Apertura and Intermedio tournaments, so that the Intermedio (rebranded as Torneo Inicial in the proposal) would be played at the beginning of the season followed by the Apertura tournament during the winter months. However, the clubs did not accept the proposal and the season will be played in a similar way to the previous ones.

Teams
16 teams compete in the season: the top thirteen teams in the relegation table of the 2022 season as well as three promoted teams from the Segunda División. The three lowest placed teams in the relegation table of the 2022 season, Albion, Rentistas, and Cerrito were relegated to the Segunda División for the 2023 season. They were replaced by the Segunda División champions Racing, runners-up La Luz, and the winners of the promotion play-offs Cerro.

Racing and Cerro returned to the top flight after three and two seasons, respectively, whilst La Luz played in the Primera División for the first time ever. On the other hand, Albion were relegated after one season, Cerrito were relegated after two seasons, and Rentistas returned to the second tier after three years.

Stadiums and locations

Personnel and kits

Managerial changes

Notes

Torneo Apertura
The Torneo Apertura, named "Julio César Morales", is the first tournament of the 2023 season. It began on 4 February 2023 and is scheduled to end on 14 May 2023.

Standings

Results

Top scorers

{| class="wikitable" border="1"
|-
! Rank
! Player
! Club
! Goals
|-
| align=center | 1
| Matías Arezo
|Peñarol
| align=center | 8
|-
| rowspan=3 align=center | 2
| Christian Ebere
|Plaza Colonia
| rowspan=3 align=center | 4
|-
| Sebastián Fernández
|Danubio
|-
| Diego Hernández
|Montevideo Wanderers
|-
| rowspan=8 align=center | 5
| Adrián Balboa
|Defensor Sporting
| rowspan=8 align=center | 3
|-
| Maximiliano Cantera
|Deportivo Maldonado
|-
| Andrés Ferrari
|Defensor Sporting
|-
| Emmanuel Gigliotti
|Nacional
|-
| Emiliano Gómez
|Boston River
|-
| Alan Medina
|Liverpool
|-
| Álvaro Navarro
|Defensor Sporting
|-
| Ignacio Ramírez
|Nacional
|}

Source: AUF

Relegation
Relegation is determined at the end of the season by computing an average of the number of points earned per game over the two most recent seasons: 2022 and 2023. The three teams with the lowest average at the end of the season will be relegated to the Segunda División for the following season.

References

External links
Asociación Uruguaya de Fútbol - Campeonato Uruguayo 

2023
2023 in Uruguayan football
Uruguay
Uruguay